Toplica may refer to:

People 
 Milan Toplica (died 1389), Serbian knight
 Toplica Spasojević (born 1956), Serbian football official

Places 
Bosnia and Herzegovina
 Toplica (Kiseljak), a village in Bosnia and Herzegovina
 Toplica (Srebrenica), a village in Bosnia and Herzegovina

North Macedonia
 Toplica, Prilep, a village in North Macedonia
 Toplica, Vrapčište, a settlement in Vrapčište Municipality, North Macedonia

Romania
 Toplica, the Hungarian name for Topliţa Mureşului village, Certeju de Sus Commune, Hunedoara County, Romania

Serbia
 Toplica (river), a river in Central Serbia
 Toplica (region), a region in Serbia around the Toplica River
 Toplica District

See also
 Topliţa, a city in Romania
 Toplice (disambiguation)